União Latino-Americana de Tecnologia (abbreviated ULT) is a Brazilian Higher Education institution, based in Jaguariaíva, Paraná (state). It was founded in 2002.

References

External links
 Official ULT Website 

Educational institutions established in 2002
Education in Paraná (state)
Jaguariaíva
2002 establishments in Brazil